The United States women's national soccer team is the most successful women's national team in the history of the Women's World Cup, having won four titles, earning second-place once and third-place finishes three times. The United States is one of the countries besides Germany, Japan, and Norway to win a FIFA Women's World Cup (China 1991, United States 1999, Canada 2015, France 2019). The United States are also the only team that has played the maximum number of matches possible in every tournament.

1991 World Cup

For the first World Cup Women's Championship, the United States qualified as the North and Central America Qualifications. At a tournament in Port-au-Prince, Haiti's capital, they met in the first round Trinidad and Tobago, Mexico, and Martinique (who, as a non-FIFA member, could not qualify for the World Cup). The U.S. prevailed with three wins, scoring 34–0 goals. In the semifinals, hosts Haiti were defeated 10–0 in the final Canada, which also reached the final without conceding, 5–0. Thus, the U.S. qualified as the only CONCACAF representative for the World Cup finals.

In China, the team met Sweden, Brazil, and Japan in the group stage. On November 17, 1991, they played in Panyu their first World Cup match and won against Sweden 3–2. Carin Jennings scored the first two World Cup goals for the United States. After a 5-0 win over Brazil and a 3-0 win over Japan, the group winners reached the quarter-finals. This was followed by a 7-0 victory over the Republic of China and a 5-2 draw against Germany in the semifinals, Carin Jennings led the US with a "flawless" hat-trick. In the final then vice-European Champion Norway was the opponent and here it was Michelle Akers, who secured the 2–1 victory with two goals and was also the top scorer with a total of 10 goals. Carin Jennings was awarded the Golden Ball for Best Player of the Tournament.

Quarter-finals

Semi-finals

Final

1995 World Cup

Unlike the men's World Cup, where the defending champion was automatically qualified until 2002, the defending champion had to qualify for the women's second World Cup. In the Qualification Tournament in Montreal, the U.S. impressively scored four wins and 34 goals and 1 conceded. Opponents were Canada, who also finished second as the CONCACAF teams now have two starting slots, Mexico, Trinidad and Tobago and Jamaica.

In Sweden, in the first group match, the United States faced People's Republic of China and played to a 3-3 draw. The second game was a 2-0 victory over Denmark and the final group game was a 4–1 victory over Australia. Both the U.S. and China had a 2-1 record, but the U.S. were group winners by virtue of the better goal difference. In the quarterfinals, the U.S. met Japan and won 4–0, setting up a semifinal match with Norway that was a rematch of the previous World Cup final. This time, the Norwegians prevailed, winning the game 1–0 and going on to win the final match. This was the first World Cup loss for the United States. In the match for third place, the U.S. played China again and this time won 2–0.

Group C

Quarter-finals

Semi-finals

Third place play-off

1999 World Cup

For the third World Cup, the United States qualified as host. In 1996, the United States had won the first women's football tournament in the Olympic Games and was therefore a favorite for the World Cup title. They also lived up to their role in the first games. In the first group match they met Denmark and won 3-0. In the second match, Nigeria was defeated 7-1 and in the third match Korea DPR 3-0. In the quarter-finals, European Champion Germany was defeated 3–2 and Brazil was defeated in the semi-final 2–0. The final in Los Angeles against China then took place in front of a record crowd of 90,185 spectators. No women's football match recognized by FIFA had attracted more spectators.

The final match was the first scoreless one, and after 120 minutes it went to a penalty shootout for the first time. While all five U.S. shooters were successful, Liu Ying couldn't get the ball past Briana Scurry. Brandi Chastain, after being the last shooter to succeed, pulled off her jersey and knelt in her black sports bra on the field, exulting in the U.S. victory.

Group A

Quarter-finals

Semi-finals

Final

2003 World Cup

The 2003 World Cup was originally to take place again in China PR. Due to the SARS epidemic, the tournament was temporarily relocated to the United States. Thus, the World Cup took place for the second time in the United States, making the U.S. the only nation to host two consecutive World Cup tournaments. As hosts, the U.S. were again automatically qualified, but they still took part in the qualifying 2002 CONCACAF Women's Gold Cup, which they won with a Golden goal 2-1 against Canada. With this victory in the finals, they would have automatically qualified for the World Cup.

In the group stage of the World Cup they met Sweden in the first game and won 3–1. This was followed by a 5–0 win against Africa Champion Nigeria and a 3–0 win over North Korea. As a group winner, the United States then met Norway and won 1–0. In one of the best women's World Cup games, they then lost in the semi-final against  Germany 0–3, the last two goals cominig in stoppage time. In the match for 3rd place, Canada was defeated 3-1. Germany won their first World Cup title with a Golden goal by Nia Künzer in the final.

Group A

Quarter-finals

Semi-finals

Third place play-off

2007 World Cup

In 2007, the World Cup took place for the second time in the People's Republic of China. The CONCACAF Women's Gold Cup 2006 again served as a qualifier, with the U.S. only having to intervene in the semifinals. With a 2–0 win against Mexico, they qualified for the World Cup and the final. They won 2–1 against Canada, as they had four years earlier, but only by a foul penalty in the 120th minute.

The U.S. traveled to the World Cup as Olympic Champions. In China, they had the same preliminary round opponents as four years earlier, but started with a 2–2 draw against North Korea. A 2–0 victory over Sweden was followed by a defeat of Nigeria 1–0, on a goal by Lori Chalupny in the first minute against the Africa Champion. The quarter-final against England was won 3–0, with all three goals coming in the second half. Coach Greg Ryan replaced Hope Solo by Briana Scurry, the only goalkeeper in the past 10 World Cup matches, for the semifinals against Brazil which the U.S. lost 0–4. Solo accused the coach in an interview to have made a mistake with the change, saying she herself could have prevented the goal-scoring.  Although Solo apologized a little later for her remarks, she was not used in the match for third place, which was won against Norway 4–1, nor did she join the team on the journey home. Solo was only appointed back into the squad of the U.S. national team in early 2008 by coach Pia Sundhage. Semi-final winner Brazil then lost in the final to defending champion Germany, who succeeded as the first team in women's soccer to defend their title, and the first team to not concede a goal in the World Cup.

Group B

The four teams were also paired in the same group in 2003.

Quarter-finals

Semi-finals

Third place play-off

2011 World Cup

For the World Cup in Germany, the U.S. qualified only by the detour of the intercontinental playoffs. Previously, in the 2010 CONCACAF Women's World Cup Qualifying, which again served as a qualifier, the US won the preliminary round with three wins against Haiti (5: 0), Guatemala (9: 0) and Costa Rica (4: 0). But then a game was lost in the Gold Cup with a 1–2 defeat by Mexico in the semi-final. Although victorious in the third-place match against Costa Rica by a score of 3-0, this was not sufficient for direct qualification. Instead, two games against Italy had to be contested, both of which were won 1–0 (aggregate 2–0) in favor of the United States.

The U.S. team traveled to Germany again as Olympic Champions. In the group stage, as in the two previous tournaments North Korea and Sweden were again the opponents, and also World Cup newcomer Colombia. For the first time, the U.S. team was coached by a foreigner, the Swedish Pia Sundhage, who had previously led the U.S. team in 2008 for their third Olympic victory. After two wins against North Korea (2–0) and Colombia (3–0), the United States lost to Sweden 2–1. Thus, the United States were only second in the group standings and met South America Champion Brazil in the quarterfinals. The U.S. took the lead in the second minute with Daiane's own goal, but had to settle for a penalty kick in the 68th minute when Marta converted the penalty. The Brazilians were fortunate, though Hope Solo held the first penalty from Cristiane Rozeira, but referee Jacqui Melksham let them repeat because one U.S. player had run into the penalty area too early. On the second attempt Marta was ultimately successful. In addition, the U.S. was now outnumbered, as Rachel Buehler had been given a [red card]. The score remained until the end of regular time at 1–1, which forced an extension. In this Marta scored after just two minutes,  giving Brazil a 2–1 lead. In the second minute of extra time, Abby Wambach managed a 2–2 equalizer after a long Megan Rapinoe cross.

The semifinal match was against France, in their first World Cup appearance, and the U.S. won 3-1 moving them for the third time into the final. This game pitted the U.S. against Japan, who had won their first-ever victory in the quarter-finals with a surprising victory against the hosts (and two-time defending champions) Germany. The United States had never lost to Japan before and were therefore a favorite. After a goalless first half, Alex Morgan made it 1–0 in the 69th minute. Japan was able to equalize in the 81st minute, which forced an extension. Again, the Americans took the lead; Homare Sawa, however, scored three minutes from the end of extra time with her fifth tournament goal, making her the top scorer of the tournament. In stoppage time Azusa Iwashimizu received the red card because of an emergency brake, but it remained at 2–2, so that for the second time the penalty shoot-out had to decide the world title. Although Japanese goalkeeper Ayumi Kaihori was only 170 centimeters tall, she held two penalties against the U.S., and also Carli Lloyd shot over the goal, while three Japanese women turned and only one failed. Japan thus became the first football world champions from Asia.

Group C

Quarter-finals

Semi-finals

Final

2015 World Cup

In the Qualification, which was again hosted by the CONCACAF Women's Gold Cup 2014, the U.S. was again the winner. In the first round, the first game against Trinidad and Tobago was a narrow 1–0 victory; the next two matches were more decisive, with defeats of Guatemala and Haiti (5–0 and 6–0). In the semi-final, the U.S. had a 3–0 win over Mexico, and with the 6–0 win over Costa Rica in the final, the U.S. exceeded their own 1991 record for goals in a final.

The U.S. group included Nigeria, Sweden and Australia. The group was considered the most balanced of the World Cup; it was the only one with four teams that at least reached the semi-finals in their last continental championship matches.

For the World Cup, the United States traveled again as Olympic Champions. In the first game, the U.S. women won 3–1 against lively Australians, followed by a goalless draw against Sweden and in the last group match, Nigeria, Abby Wambach, who scored her final goal, secured the 1–0 victory over the Africa champion with her 14th goal. In the round of 16 against Colombia, Wambach missed her penalty kick, but her teammates Alex Morgan and Carli Lloyd (penalties) scored to secure the entry into the quarter-finals.

In the quarter-final match, the U.S. dominated the game but missed many chances while the Chinese shot only once on the U.S. goal in the whole game. As in 1999, the game went without goals in the second half, but six minutes after the restart Carli Lloyd scored to ensure a 1–0 victory in their 200th international match. In the semifinals, the two two-time World Champions United States and Germany met, and the U.S. prevailed with 2–0 to become the first team to reached the finals for the fourth time. The final match was a repeat of 2011 against Japan, who had reached the finals with six wins. In this game Christie Rampone became the oldest World Cup player in history.  After just five minutes, the U.S. led 2–0, after 16 minutes it was 4–0, so the game was virtually decided. Japan was able to score once in the first half, and shortly after the break the U.S. helped them with an own goal, but quickly recovered to score another insurance goal, for a final score of 5-2. The United States became the first team to win a third World Cup title.

Group D

Round of 16

Quarter-finals

Semi-finals

Final

2019 World Cup

In the Qualification, which was again hosted by CONCACAF Women's Gold Cup 2018, the U.S. qualified to reach the finals. In the preliminary round, the first game against Mexico was won 6–0, then Panama and Trinidad and Tobago were beaten just as clearly (5–0 and 7–0). In the semifinals, the U.S. won a 6–0 game against Jamaica, and in the final a 2–0 victory against Canada.

At the World Cup, the Americans won their first match with a 13–0 record victory against Thailand, with Alex Morgan being the second player to score five goals in one match, and the team scoring a total of 10 goals in the second half. They won 3–0 against World Cup debutant Chile, scoring all three goals in the first half. In the last group game they met Sweden for the sixth time in a World Cup group match and won 2–0. As Group F winners, the Americans advanced to the round of 16 against Spain, who reached the knockout round for the first time at their second World Cup. Two penalties were converted by Megan Rapinoe as the U.S. won 2–1. In the quarter-finals they met France and thus for the first time in a World Cup, they played a match against the hosts. They again won 2–1, with Rapinoe again scoring twice. Thus, the U.S. met England in the semifinals, and achieved another 2-1 win. Goalkeeper Alyssa Naeher secured the victory by saving a penalty shot in the 84th minute. Their title was defended in the final with a 2–0 victory against European champions the Netherlands, giving the United States a record fourth World Cup title.

Group F

Round of 16

Quarter-finals

Semi-finals

Final

2023 World Cup

Group E

FIFA World Cup record
The team has participated in every World Cup through 2019, reach the semifinals in all, and won a medal in each.

Record by opponent

On July 9, 2016, Hope Solo earned her 100th international shutout, 150th career win, and 197th cap in a friendly game against South Africa at Soldier Field, Chicago, Illinois. This made Solo the first ever female goalkeeper in history to achieve 100 shutouts in international competition.

Goalscorers

 Own goals scored for opponents
 Brandi Chastain (scored for Germany in 1999)
 Leslie Osborne (scored for Brazil in 2007)
Julie Johnston (scored for Japan in 2015)

References

 
World Cup
Countries at the FIFA Women's World Cup